The Naemateliaceae are a family of fungi in the order Tremellales. The family currently contains two genera.

References

Tremellomycetes
Naemateliaceae